Events in the year 1657 in the Spanish Netherlands and Prince-bishopric of Liège (predecessor states of modern Belgium).

Incumbents

Habsburg Netherlands
Monarch – Philip IV, King of Spain and Duke of Brabant, of Luxembourg, etc.

Governor General – John of Austria the Younger

Prince-Bishopric of Liège
Prince-Bishop – Maximilian Henry of Bavaria

Events
 Trinity College, Leuven founded

March
 Treaty of Paris: Anglo-French alliance targeting Dunkirk

June
 26 June – Andreas Creusen installed as Archbishop of Mechelen

Births
Date uncertain
 Jan Baptist Tijssens the Younger, painter (died after 1723)

January
 17 January (baptism) – Pieter van Bloemen, painter (died 1720)

Deaths
Date uncertain
 Gilles De Haes (born 1597), military commander

March
 15 March – Pierre Fisch, abbot of Echternach

April
 2 April – Ferdinand III (born 1608), Holy Roman Emperor

May
 28 May – Anthonius Triest (born 1576), bishop of Ghent

October
 1 October – Albert Rubens (born 1614), scholar and administrator

References